Jules Croiset (born 9 October 1937) is a Dutch actor. He has appeared in more than 40 films and television shows since 1960. He is also known for having staged his own abduction by neo-Nazis in 1987.

Selected filmography
 Help! The Doctor Is Drowning (1974)
 Doctor Snuggles (1980) (voice)
 De Witte Waan (1984)
 Amsterdamned (1988)
 Intensive Care (1991)
 The Butterfly Lifts the Cat Up (1994)
 Nachtvlinder (1999)
 Michiel de Ruyter (2015)

References

External links

20th-century Dutch people
1937 births
Dutch male film actors
Living people
People from Deventer